C.S. Porter School also known as Porter Middle School, is a public middle school located in Missoula, Montana. The school is a part of Missoula County Public Schools, and is one of three public middle schools in the city of Missoula. Originally serving grades 5–8, the school now serves only grades 6–8.

Programs

COMPASS
The COMPASS program is designed for gifted students and stands for Creating Opportunities to Meet Potential and Stretch Skills. Students must take a test and receive a referral to qualify for the program.

Fine arts
Band

Orchestra

Choir

Flagship
The Flagship Program is a community partnership designed to help skill development in three areas: social, academic, and cultural achievement. The program aims to help students achieve in school and prepare for adulthood. Students become involved in Flagship by joining clubs and activities.

Athletics
 Boys Basketball
 Girls Basketball
 Soccer
 Track & Field
 Volleyball
 Wrestling

Clubs and activities
 African Drumming
 Art
 Babysitting club
 Band
 Choir
 Cougar Fit
 Dance
 Discovery Corps
 FLASH MOB
 Frisbee Frenzy
 Geography bee
 GUTS
 Jewelry making
 Orchestra
 Photography club
 Self-defense
 Spelling Bee
 Super Science Squad
 Swimming
 World Foods

References

Public middle schools in Montana
Schools in Missoula County, Montana
Educational institutions established in 1971
1971 establishments in Montana